Jere is a local government area of Borno State, Nigeria. It has its headquarters  in the town of Khaddamari. London ciki is a community in Jere under maimusari ward.

Landscape 
It has an area of 868 km.

Population 
Jere had a population of 211,204 at the 2006 census. Most of the people in Jere are from the Arabic tribes Baggara and kanuri.

Postal code 
The postal code of the area is 600.

History 
It is one of the sixteen LGAs that constitute the Borno Emirate, a traditional state located in Borno State, Nigeria.

References

Local Government Areas in Borno State